7 Mile is the only studio album by American contemporary R&B group 7 Mile, released  via Crave Records. The album peaked at No. 64 on the Billboard R&B chart and No. 43 on the Heatseekers chart.

Three singles were released from the album: "Just a Memory", "After" and "Do Your Thing". "Do Your Thing" was the only song from the group to chart on the Billboard Hot 100, peaking at #50.

Track listing
 Songwriting and production credits adapted from liner notes.

Chart positions

References

External links
 
 

1998 debut albums
Crave Records albums
Contemporary R&B albums by American artists